Palestine Polytechnic University (PPU) is a university located in Hebron, West Bank, Palestine. The school was founded in 1978 by the University Graduates Union (UGU), a non-profit organization in Hebron. Enrollment in 2007 exceeded 5000 students.

PPU has five colleges: College of Engineering, College of Information Technology and Computer Engineering, College of Applied Science, College of Administrative Science and Informatics and College of Applied Professions.

It offers a master's degree in Mechatronics, Mathematics, Biotechnology, and Informatics. It offers two-year diploma degrees and a Bachelor of Science degree in engineering.

PPU is officially recognized by the Palestinian Ministry of Higher Education and is an active member in the Rector Conference of Palestinian Universities, in the Islamic University Union, in the Arabic University Union, and in the Universal University Union.

The main objectives of the university are:
Assuring quality in academic programs. 
Assuring quality in administrative issues.
Encouraging scientific research.
Communicating efficiently with local communities.
Achieving full financial self – dependency.
Enhancing the university atmosphere and the extracurricular activities.

PPU dedicates particular emphasis to its relationship with the local community.

History 
In 2020 the University said it would be naming one of its gates after Abu Iyad, a perpetrator of the Munich massacre.

Notable alumni 

 Yacoub Shaheen, Palestinian singer
 Ahmad Rabaie, Palestinian diplomat

See also
 List of Palestinian universities
 Education in the State of Palestine

References

External links
Palestine Polytechnic University

Palestine Polytechnic University
Educational institutions established in 1978
1978 establishments in the Israeli Military Governorate